Juvenal Edjogo Owono Montalbán (born 3 April 1979), known simply as Juvenal, is a football manager and former professional player who operated as a midfielder. Born and raised in Spain to an Equatoguinean father and a Spanish mother, he capped for the Equatorial Guinea national team.

Club career
Born in Sabadell, Barcelona, Catalonia, Spain to an Equatoguinean father and a Spanish mother, Juvenal played in the lower leagues in four of his first five years as a senior, including three with RCD Espanyol's reserves, who loaned him to Levante UD in 2001 for his first professional experience (Segunda División). In the 2003–04 season he was part of Racing de Santander's La Liga roster, but did not appear in the competition for the Cantabrians, being released in the January transfer window.

In the following two seasons, Juvenal played in the second level, achieving top-flight promotions with both Deportivo Alavés and Recreativo de Huelva. In the 2006–07 campaign he failed that objective with CD Tenerife, also appearing in less than one half of the league games.

In the summer of 2008, after one season in Segunda División B with FC Cartagena, the 29-year-old Juvenal returned to his hometown and signed for CE Sabadell FC, contributing with 34 appearances and five goals in his third year as the Arlequinats returned to the second tier after an absence of 18 years.

International career
Juvenal qualified for Equatorial Guinea because of his father, born in Niefang – his mother hailed from Andalusia. He made his debut for the national team in 2003 and, between that year and 2008, appeared in eight FIFA World Cup qualification matches, scoring on 7 June 2008 in a 1–4 away defeat against South Africa for the 2010 edition.

In late 2007, Juvenal played in unofficial games against the Region of Murcia and Extremadura. Two months before his 36th birthday, and immediately after the 2015 Africa Cup of Nations, he retired from international football.

Personal life
Juvenal's younger brothers, Alberto and José, were also footballers. They competed exclusively in the Spanish lower leagues or amateur championships.

Career statistics

Club

International goals
(Equatorial Guinea score listed first, score column indicates score after each Juvenal goal)

References

External links

1979 births
Living people
Citizens of Equatorial Guinea through descent
Equatoguinean sportspeople of Spanish descent
Spanish sportspeople of Equatoguinean descent
Sportspeople from Sabadell
Equatoguinean footballers
Spanish footballers
Footballers from Catalonia
Association football midfielders
Segunda División players
Segunda División B players
Tercera División players
UE Vilassar de Mar players
RCD Espanyol B footballers
Levante UD footballers
Racing de Santander players
CD Castellón footballers
Deportivo Alavés players
Recreativo de Huelva players
CD Tenerife players
FC Cartagena footballers
CE Sabadell FC footballers
UE Cornellà players
FC Santa Coloma players
Equatorial Guinea international footballers
2012 Africa Cup of Nations players
2015 Africa Cup of Nations players
Equatoguinean expatriate footballers
Spanish expatriate footballers
Expatriate footballers in Andorra
Equatoguinean expatriate sportspeople in Andorra
Spanish expatriate sportspeople in Andorra